Tomas Micael Domene (born 4 September 1997) is an Argentine field hockey player who plays as a forward for Belgian Hockey League club Orée and the Argentina national team.

Club career
Domene played club hockey in Argentina for Córdoba until 2017, when he transferred to Belgium to play for Orée.

International career

Junior national team
Domene made his debut for the junior national team at the Pan American Junior Championship in Toronto, Canada. At the tournament he scored 16 goals, helping Argentina to a gold medal and qualification to the Junior World Cup. Domene again represented Argentina at the Junior World Cup in Lucknow, India, where the team finished 5th.

Senior national team
Domene debuted for the senior national team in 2018, in a test series against Malaysia, in Buenos Aires. Domene's latest appearance for Argentina was at the 2018 Men's International Hockey Open in Darwin, Australia. He made his World Cup debut at the 2023 Men's FIH Hockey World Cup.

References

External links

1997 births
Living people
Argentine male field hockey players
Male field hockey forwards
Place of birth missing (living people)
2023 Men's FIH Hockey World Cup players
21st-century Argentine people
Men's Belgian Hockey League players